The Timor-Leste national Under-23 football team (also known as Timor-Leste U-23 or Seleção U-23) represents the Timor-Leste in international football competitions in the Olympic Games, Asian Games, Southeast Asian Games and any other under-23 international football tournaments.  It is controlled by the Federação de Futebol de Timor-Leste, the governing body of football in the country. Timor Leste is currently one of the weakest teams in the world. They won their first match on 5 November 2011 against Brunei, scoring 2–1.

History
Football was firstly introduced during Portuguese Timor era where many local and the Portuguese colonial official played the sport for enjoyment. After the Portuguese leave the eastern part of the island of Timor, neighbouring Indonesia invaded and change their culture and identity. East Timor gained full independence in 2002 after more than 20 years of occupation which resulted in a long running battle against Jakarta-led forces. The Timor-Leste U-23 team was invited to the 2005 AFF U-23 Youth Championship without any success, which is the first time that the team played in an international tournament. In 2009, the team entered the first Southeast Asian Games. Once again, they lost every match, including a 0–11 loss to Malaysia. Timor-Leste had major improvements at the 2011 SEA Games, when they used overseas players of Timorese descent from Brazil and Australia. These players contributed a lot to their successful run; especially from Murilo de Almeida who managed to score three goals. The team finished third in their group by recording their first win in their history, finishing above Laos, Brunei and the Philippines and had a goal difference of –4, which was a big improvement compared to their previous participation where the team finished last in their group with no wins from four games, scoring only once and having a goal difference of –28.

Kits
Timor-Leste's traditional home kit includes a red shirt, black shorts and red or black socks. The away kits feature white or yellow shirts. At the 2009 SEA Games, their home kit resemble the one worn by the Belgium national team.

Kit evolution

Stadium
 East Timor National Stadium (2002–present)

Competitive record

Olympic Games

Asian Games Record
(Under-23 Team since 2002)

AFC U-23 Championship Record

SEA Games Record
(Under-23 Team since 2001)

AFF U-23 Youth Championship record

Coaching staff

Players

Current squad
 The following players were selected for the 2021 SEA Games.

Recent results

31st Southeast Asian Games

List of coaches

References

External links
 Profile at FIFA.com
 Profile at the-AFC.com
 Profile at AFF Site

u23
Asian national under-23 association football teams